The FUL MA 30 Graffiti is a German ultralight trike, designed and produced by Fachschule für Ultraleicht und Motorflug of Hörselberg-Hainich, Thuringia. The aircraft is supplied as a complete ready-to-fly-aircraft.

The manufacturer is a flying school and aircraft importer that decided to produce their own model ultralight trike.

Design and development
It features a cable-braced hang glider-style high-wing, weight-shift controls, a two-seats-in-tandem open cockpit with a cockpit fairing, tricycle landing gear with wheel pants and a single engine in pusher configuration.

The aircraft is made from bolted-together aluminum tubing joined by titanium fittings, with its double surface wing covered in Dacron sailcloth. Its  span wing is supported by a single tube-type kingpost and uses an "A" frame weight-shift control bar. The standard powerplant is a twin cylinder, liquid-cooled, two-stroke, dual-ignition  Rotax 582 engine, but a wide range of engines are available.

The aircraft has some unique features: the seat assembly and engine mount are integrated and the fuel tank will automatically depart the aircraft in the event of an impact. A wide range of different wings can be fitted to the basic carriage.

Specifications (MA 30 Graffiti)

References

External links

2000s German sport aircraft
2000s German ultralight aircraft
Single-engined pusher aircraft
Ultralight trikes